The North American cougar (Puma concolor couguar) is a cougar subspecies in North America.  It is the biggest cat in North America, with North American jaguars being fairly small.   It was once common in eastern North America, and is still prevalent in the western half of the continent. This subspecies includes populations in western Canada, the western United States, Florida, Mexico and Central America, and possibly South America northwest of the Andes Mountains. It thus includes the extirpated Eastern cougar and extant Florida panther populations.

Taxonomic history

As of 2017, P. c. cougar was recognised as being valid by the Cat Classification Taskforce of the Cat Specialist Group. P. c. costaricensis had been regarded as a subspecies in Central America.

Description

The North American cougar has a solid tan-colored coat without spots and weighs . Females average , about the same as a jaguar in the Chamela-Cuixmala Biosphere Reserve on the Mexican Pacific coast.

Habitat and distribution
The North American cougar lives in various places and habitats. Several populations still exist and are thriving in the Western United States, Southern Florida, and Western Canada, but the North American cougar was once commonly found in eastern portions of the United States. It was believed to be extirpated there in the early 1900s. In Michigan, it was thought to have been killed off and extinct in the early 1900s. Today there is evidence to support that cougars could be on the rise in Mexico and could have a substantial population in years to come. Some mainstream scientists believe that small relict populations may exist (around 50 individuals), especially in the Appalachian Mountains and eastern Canada. Recent scientific findings in hair traps in Fundy National Park in New Brunswick have confirmed the existence of at least three cougars in New Brunswick. The Ontario Puma Foundation estimates that there are currently 850 cougars in Ontario. 

The Quebec wildlife services also considers cougars to be present in the province as a threatened species after multiple DNA tests confirmed cougar hair in lynx mating sites. The only unequivocally known eastern population is the critically endangered Florida panther. There have been unconfirmed sightings in Elliotsville Plantation, Maine (north of Monson) and as early as 1997 in New Hampshire.

Sightings in the eastern United States
Reported sightings of cougars in the eastern United States continue today, despite their status as extirpated.
 Connecticut
 In 2011, a cougar was sighted in Greenwich, Connecticut, and later killed by an SUV in Milford after allegedly travelling  from South Dakota.
 Illinois
 On April 14, 2008, a cougar triggered a flurry of reports before being cornered and killed in the Chicago neighborhood of Roscoe Village while officers tried to contain it. The cougar was the first sighted in the city limits of Chicago since the city was founded in 1833.
On November 22, 2013, a cougar was found on a farm near Morrison in Whiteside County, Illinois. An Illinois Department of Natural Resources officer subsequently shot and killed the cougar after determining it posed a risk to the public.
 Michigan
 According to the Michigan Department of Natural Resources, there were fifteen confirmed cougar sightings in the state in 2020 and, as of October, there had been ten confirmed sightings in the Upper Peninsula in 2021. The Department said that the steep increase in sightings may be attributable to the proliferation of trail cameras.
 Tennessee
 On September 26, 2015, a hair sample was submitted by a hunter in Carroll County, Tennessee; DNA analysis indicated it was a female with genetics similar to cougars in South Dakota. Bobcats in this state currently reside in regions that were once roamed by cougars. 
 Wisconsin
 Genetic analysis of DNA from a cougar sighting in Wisconsin in 2008 indicated that a cougar was in Wisconsin and that it was not a captive animal. The cougar is thought to have migrated from a native population in the Black Hills of South Dakota; however, the genetic analysis could not affirm that hypothesis. Whether other, perhaps breeding, cougars are present is also uncertain. A second sighting was reported and tracks were documented in a nearby Wisconsin community. Unfortunately, a genetic analysis could not be done and a determination could not be made. This cougar later made its way south into the northern Chicago suburb of Wilmette.
 On June 3, 2013, a verified sighting was made in Florence County, Wisconsin. The cougar was photographed by an automatic trail camera, and confirmed by DNR biologists in October, 2013.
 In December, 2020, two sightings, one verified, were made in Dane County, in and around Stoughton, Wisconsin. The cougar was photographed by an individual, and confirmed by the  Wisconsin DNR.
 In November 2021, a DNR representative told WDJT-TV that the Department confirms about 15 cougar sightings per year in the state.

While the origins of these animals are unknown, some cougar experts believe some are captive animals that have been released or escaped.

Ecology

The North American cougar usually hunts at night and sometimes travels long distances in search of food. Its average litter size is three cubs. It is fast, and can maneuver quite easily and skillfully. Depending on the abundance of prey such as deer, it shares the same prey as the jaguar in Central or North America.
Other sympatric predators include the grizzly bear and American black bears. Cougars are known to prey on bear cubs. Cougars in the Great Basin have been recorded to prey on feral horses.

Rivalry between the cougar and grizzly was a popular topic in North America. Fights between them were staged, and those in the wilderness were recorded by people, including Natives.

Threats and conservation

Even though conservation efforts of the cougar have decreased against the "more appealing" jaguar, it is hunted less frequently because it has no spots, and is thus less desirable to hunters. 

In Oregon, a healthy population of 5,000 was reported in 2006, exceeding a target of 3,000. California has actively sought to protect the cat and has an estimated population of 4,000 to 6,000. With the increase of human development and infrastructure growth in California, the cougar populations in the state are becoming more isolated from one another.

A 2012 study using 18 motion-sensitive cameras in Río Los Cipreses National Reserve counted a population of two males and two females (one of them with at least two cubs) in an area of 600 km2 (0.63 cougars per 100 km2). The Bay Area Puma Project aims to obtain information on cougar populations in the San Francisco Bay area and the animals' interactions with habitat, prey, humans, and residential communities. A study on wildlife ecologists showed that urban cougar populations exist around the Los Angeles metropolitan area, with individuals of these populations having the smallest home ranges recorded for any cougars studied, and being primarily nocturnal and not crepuscular (most likely adaptations to avoid humans in high-density areas).

See also
 Shasta (mascot)
 South American cougar
 American cheetah (extinct species related to the cougar, despite its name)
 Felinae

References

Sources
 Wright, Bruce S. The Eastern Panther: A Question of Survival. Toronto: Clarke, Irwin and Company, 1972.

External links
 Eastern Cougar Foundation
 National Heritage Information Centre: General Element Report: Puma concolor
 New York State Department of Environmental Conservation: Eastern Cougar Fact Sheet
 The IUCN Red List of Threatened Species
 Photograph of a black or dark cougar in Costa Rica
 Largest North American Cat: Mountain Lion (Cougar)

Cougar
Felids of Central America
Mammals described in 1792
Mammals of Canada
Mammals of the United States
Mammals of Mexico
Taxa named by Robert Kerr (writer)
Fur trade
Fauna of California